CGV may refer to:
Charron, Girardot et Voigt, early 20th-century motorcar
CJ CGV, South Korean cinema chain
CGV Cinemas Indonesia, (formerly blitzmegaplex and CGV Blitz) a movie theater chain in Indonesia.
Ship prefix for Norwegian (NoCGV) and Icelandic (ICGV) coast guard vessels
Compagnie Generale de Videotechnique, a video appliance manufacturer in Strasbourg, France